The 2019 Chengdu Hunters season was the first season of Chengdu Hunters's existence in the Overwatch League as one of eight expansion franchises added for the 2019 season. After posting three consecutive 3–4 records for the first three stages, the Hunters failed to qualify for any of the Stage Playoffs. A 4–3 record in Stage 4 gave Chengdu 13–15 record for the season and qualified them for the Play-In Tournament, where they were eliminated in the first round by the Guangzhou Charge by a 1–4 scoreline.

Preceding offseason 
Chengdu announced the entirety of their initial starting roster in late November, consisting of the following players:
Kong "Kyo" Chun-ting,
Li "Yveltal" Xian-yao,
Guan "GARRY" Li,
Luo "Elsa" Wen-jie,
Ding "ameng" Meng-han,
Ma "lateyoung" Tian-bin,
Yi "JinMu" Hu,
Lo "Baconjack" Tzu-Heng, and
Zhang "YangXiaoLong" Zhi-hao.
The team also had signed Ted "silkthread" Wang, but silkthread retired from professional Overwatch on November 30. On January 16, Chengdu signed Wei "jiqiren" Yan-song.

Regular season

Stage 1 
Chengdu opened their 2019 season on February 15 with a victory over fellow Chinese expansion franchise Guangzhou Charge. After their second week of play, which resulted in a loss to Seoul Dynasty and a win over Florida Mayhem, it became apparent that Chengdu was generally not playing to the triple tank, triple support meta that the majority of the league was; instead, the team primarily featured a DPS-heavy composition. Chengdu would go on to lose three matches straight before defeating Atlanta Reign in their final match of Stage 1 to finish the stage with a 3–4 record.

Stage 2 
Hunters began Stage 2 with a match against Paris Eternal on April 6. Sticking with their off-meta team composition strategy, Chengdu swept Paris 4–0. Chengdu defeated Washington Justice 3–1 a day later in a match that featured an Overwatch League record 27 out of the 30 possible heroes in the game. Despite the strong start, Chengdu went on a three-game losing streak before finding their next win against London Spitfire on April 28.
Chengdu's final match of the stage was against Los Angeles Valiant. Hunters lost the match 2–3 to put them out of playoff contention and for the second stage in a row, finish the stage with a 3–4 record.

Stage 3 

The Hunters opened Stage 3 on June 6 with a 1–3 loss to the Guangzhou Charge. Two days later, the team was swept 0–4 by the Los Angeles Valiant. Chengdu took on the Dallas Fuel a week later, looking to rebound from the previous two losses. The team kept Dallas guessing throughout the match and took a decisive 3–1 victory. The team's next match was on June 21, when they faced the undefeated Vancouver Titans. While Chengdu was able to take the first map of the match, they dropped the following three, leading to a 1–3 loss. The Hunters rebounded two days later, when they swept the Dallas Fuel 4–0 in a rematch of the previous week. For the final week of the stage, Chengdu first took on the Stage 2 Champions San Francisco Shock on June 27. The match went to a fifth tiebreaker map, and the Hunters managed to pull out a 3–2 victory. Chengdu was unable to close out the stage with a winning record, however, as they fell 0–3 to the Seoul Dynasty three days later and ended the stage with another 3–4 record.

Stage 4 
A day prior to their first match of Stage 4, which would include the implementation of an enforced 2-2-2 role lock by the League, the Hunters brought in DPS prospect Xin "leave" Huang. The 17-year-old would not be eligible to officially sign with the Hunters until 2020 season.

The team's first match of the stage was against the Philadelphia Fusion on July 26. The match went the distance, needing a fifth map to determine the winner; Chengdu was able to take map five to win 3–2. Two days later, the team faced the Boston Uprising. The match also went the distance, and with game MVP performance from support Xianyao "Yveltal" Li on Mercy, Chengdu took another 3–2 win. The following week, the Hunters faced the Los Angeles Gladiators. For the third match in a row, the game went to a fifth tiebreaker map; this time, Chengdu was unable to pull out the win and lost the match 2–3. The team came back in full force two days later with a match against the Atlantic Champions New York Excelsior. DPS Yi "Jinmu" Hu on Pharah gave New York troubles throughout the series; that, along with Chengdu's ability to dive NYXL's Jeong "Nenne" Yeon-kwan on Widowmaker, proved to be too much for the Excelsior to handle, as handed New York their first 4–0 sweep in franchise history. The following week, Chengdu faced the Hangzhou Spark; the team fell 1–3 in the match. The Hunter's final week of play saw them first face the San Francisco Shock on August 16. Chengdu was dominated throughout the match and was swept 0–4. Needing a win to keep their slim playoff hopes alive, the Hunters faced the Houston Outlaws in their final match of the season. Chengdu pulled out a 3–2 victory after the match went to a fifth tiebreaker map. The team finished the season with a 13–15 record and qualified for the Play-In Tournament.

Postseason 
As the twelfth seed in the overall standings, the Hunters qualified for the Play-In Tournament, where they took on the ninth-seeded Guangzhou Charge on August 30. After dropping the first two maps, Ilios and Eichenwalde, the Hunters closed the gap by taking map three, Horizon Lunar Colony. However, the Charge would not yield another map, as the Hunters lost the match 1–4 and ended their 2019 season.

Final roster

Transactions 
Transactions of/for players on the roster during the 2019 regular season:
On July 25, Hunters signed Xin "Leave" Huang.

Standings

Record by stage

League

Game log

Regular season

Playoffs

References 

2019 Overwatch League seasons by team
chengdu hunters
Chengdu Hunters seasons